"What the Hell" is a 2011 song by American musician Avril Lavigne. 

What the Hell may also refer to:

"What the Hell", song by Ohio Players from Fire
"What the Hell", song by South Korean boy band B.A.P. from Power
"What the Hell", song by Broken Dolls, 2005
"What the Hell", song by Tim Knol, 2011
"What the Hell", song by Tokyo Dragons from Give Me the Fear, 2005
What the Hell, album by Skew Siskin, 1999

See also
What the (disambiguation)
What the Heck (disambiguation)
What the fuck (disambiguation)